Tresavean is a hamlet in the parish of Lanner, Cornwall, England, United Kingdom.

External links

Tresavean Copper Mine; Mine Explorer

Hamlets in Cornwall